Dany Sabourin (born September 2, 1980) is a Canadian professional ice hockey coach and former goaltender.

Playing career
Drafted in the fourth round, 108th overall by the Calgary Flames in the 1998 NHL Entry Draft, he played four games with Calgary before moving to the Pittsburgh Penguins. In 2006, he was awarded the Baz Bastien Memorial Trophy as top goaltender in the AHL after achieving 30 wins in 49 games with Pittsburgh's AHL farm team in Wilkes-Barre. In October 2006, the Vancouver Canucks claimed him via waivers, where he served as backup to Roberto Luongo.

On February 20, 2007, Sabourin achieved his first NHL win in 12 career games, when the Canucks defeated the Anaheim Ducks in overtime, by a score of 3–2.

On April 25, 2007, he made his playoff debut during the last 10 minutes of the third period when Roberto Luongo was pulled after Anaheim scored their 4th goal in the first game of the series. Anaheim scored their fifth goal on Sabourin during the final minute of the game, ending with a score of 5–1.

On May 3, 2007, he made his second playoff appearance in the first few minutes of overtime with the Vancouver Canucks facing elimination in Game 5 against the Ducks. He made five saves before being replaced back by Luongo, who was delayed by what was thought to be equipment problems. However, after the game, it was revealed Luongo had an untimely case of diarrhea. The Canucks later lost the game 2–1 in double overtime.

On July 1, 2007, Sabourin was signed by the Pittsburgh Penguins as an unrestricted free agent, recording 10 wins for the Penguins in the 2007–08 NHL season.

On January 17, 2009, Sabourin was traded to the Edmonton Oilers along with forward Ryan Stone and a fourth round draft pick for goaltender Mathieu Garon. However, general manager Steve Tambellini declared on the day of the trade that he had no intention of bringing Sabourin to the Edmonton Oilers club.  Instead, the Oilers stated that they intended to trade or waive Sabourin, who finished the year with Edmonton's AHL affiliate Springfield Falcons.

On July 7, 2009, he signed a one-year contract with the Boston Bruins. He was then assigned to AHL affiliate, the Providence Bruins for 2009–10.

On July 1, 2010, Sabourin signed a one-year deal with the Washington Capitals. He was assigned to AHL affiliate, the Hershey Bears on October 15. Sabourin spent the next three seasons within the Capitals organization, spending his entirety of his tenure as the Bears veteran goaltender.

On July 2, 2013, Sabourin opted to sign his first European contract, agreeing to a one-year deal with Austrian club, Graz 99ers of the EBEL. As the starting goalie for Graz over the following two seasons, Sabourin was a workhorse appearing in every game as the club missed the post-season on each occasion.

Sabourin opted to continue his European career as a free agent by signing with French Ligue Magnus club, Dragons de Rouen on April 7, 2015. After the 2016–17 season, Sabourin retired from professional hockey.

Coaching career
In 2019, Sabourin served as the goaltending coach for the Rouyn-Noranda Huskies of the QMJHL, where he worked with San Jose Sharks prospect Zachary Emond and won the 2019 Memorial Cup. The following season, he joined the Sharks' American Hockey League affiliate San Jose Barracuda as goaltending development coach.

Career statistics

Regular season and playoffs

References

External links

1980 births
Calgary Flames draft picks
Calgary Flames players
Canadian ice hockey goaltenders
French Quebecers
Graz 99ers players
Hershey Bears players
Ice hockey people from Quebec
Johnstown Chiefs players
Las Vegas Wranglers players
Living people
Lowell Lock Monsters players
Manitoba Moose players
People from Val-d'Or
Pittsburgh Penguins players
Providence Bruins players
Saint John Flames players
Sherbrooke Castors players
Sherbrooke Faucons players
Springfield Falcons players
Vancouver Canucks players
Wheeling Nailers players
Wilkes-Barre/Scranton Penguins players
Canadian expatriate ice hockey players in Austria
Canadian expatriate ice hockey players in the United States